Auxier may refer to:

Auxier, Kentucky
Randall Auxier (b. 1961), American academic
Daniel Phillip Auxier